The State of israel and the Republic of San Marino have formal diplomatic relations. San Marino has a consulate in Savyon, opened on June 28, 2004. The consul of San Marino in Israel is Michal Servadiu-Ilan. except for the consulate in Savyon, San Marino has another consul, resides in Herzliya. The Israeli embassy in Rome is accredited to San Marino.

History 
Both countries signed on a visa-waiver agreement on May 16, 1977, and on an upgrade-relations agreement on April 21, 1995.

The Israeli Minister of Foreign Affairs, Avigdor Lieberman, has met the San Marinese Minister of foreign affairs, Antonella Mularoni, at Rome on March 7, 2011. In the meeting, the San Marinese Minister expressed her will to appoint a non-resident ambassador to Israel.

On July 2, 2012, Lieberman visited again in Italy and this time he didn't pass on San Marino. this was the first visit of an Israeli politician in role to San Marino. While visiting the country, he inaugurated a hospital nearby which will serve the San Marinese people as well. afterward, he met Mularoni again, and the captain regents, he planted an Olive tree in San Marino as a gesture.

In July 2018, the Captain-regents of San Marino has visited Israel informally. They have stayed in the San Marinese consulate in Savyon.

San Marino does not recognize a Palestinian state and has no bilateral ties with the PLO.

See also 
 Foreign relations of Israel
 Foreign relations of San Marino
 Israel–Italy relations
 Holy See–Israel relations

References 

Bilateral relations of San Marino
San Marino